LG8 may refer to:

 GM LG8 engine
 Oldsmobile LG8, an Oldsmobile V8 engine
 Zhonghe Senior High School metro station (station code LG08) on the Wanda–Zhonghe–Shulin line in New Taipei, Taiwan
 Dobele District (LG08), Latvia; see List of FIPS region codes (J–L)

See also

LG (disambiguation)
LGB (disambiguation)